The Daisy Flour Mill is a restaurant and assembly hall located in what was once a flour mill on Irondequoit Creek.  It is located on Blossom Road in the town of Penfield, New York, just across the creek from Ellison Park.  Originally built in 1840, it is the last remaining mill on Irondequoit Creek.

The weatherboard building was added to the National Register of Historic Places on June 26, 1972.

References

Grinding mills on the National Register of Historic Places in New York (state)
Industrial buildings completed in 1840
Restaurants in New York (state)
Flour mills in the United States
Buildings and structures in Monroe County, New York
Grinding mills in New York (state)
National Register of Historic Places in Rochester, New York
1840 establishments in New York (state)